The Sandy Point Farmhouse is a historic home at Sandy Point State Park, Anne Arundel County, Maryland, United States. It is a five-part plan consisting of a two-story central block connected to two wings by single-story hyphens. It was built in an 18th-century style in the 19th century and typical of Maryland domestic architecture. The house was constructed about 1815 for John Gibson, a member of the Annapolis elite and a relative of Samuel Ogle, an 18th-century Governor of Maryland.

The Sandy Point Farmhouse was listed on the National Register of Historic Places in 1972.

Gallery

References

External links
, including photo from 1972, at Maryland Historical Trust
Sandy Point State Park website

Houses on the National Register of Historic Places in Maryland
Houses in Anne Arundel County, Maryland
National Register of Historic Places in Anne Arundel County, Maryland
Houses completed in 1815
1815 establishments in Maryland